Municipal elections were held in the Indian state of Punjab on 14 February 2021; the result was declared on 17 February. The elections are scheduled for 117 urban local bodies, including 8 municipal corporations and 109 municipal councils and nagar panchayats. Elections were originally scheduled to be held in October 2020, but were delayed because of the COVID-19 pandemic.

Background
The previous elections were held in February 2015, in which Shiromani Akali Dal and Bharatiya Janata Party led in most of the councils. The elections were the first since Akali Dal left the National Democratic Alliance over the farm laws protest; both Akali Dal and BJP were contesting alone. Bhagwant Maan, the state president of Aam Aadmi Party, said the party will contest elections on its party symbol (broom). Jarnail Nangal of Lok Insaaf Party demanded to postpone the elections, saying that a large number of farmers and peasants from the state were present at the farmers' protest in Delhi.

Elections
On 16 January 2021, Punjab's state election commission announced the schedule for elections. Nominations were filed until 3 February, elections on 14 February and results on 17 February.

The expenditure limit for a candidate of a municipal corporation is ₹ 3 lakh; for the candidate of municipal council Class-I is ₹ 2.70 lakh, Class-II is ₹ 1.70 lakh, Class-III is ₹ 1.45 lakh, and candidates for Nagar panchayats is ₹ 1.05 lakh.

He said that 400 members would be elected for eight municipal corporations and 1,902 members would be elected for 109 municipal councils/Nagar panchayats in the state. Fifty per cent reservation has been given for women in municipal elections, according to Punjab Government's instructions.

Election day 
20,510 polling officers with 19,000 police officials were posted for peaceful and fair elections in 109 municipal councils and nagar panchayats with eight municipal corporations.

In Bathinda Ward no. 34, a fake voter was caught in the polling booth. At many places conflict between Congress, AAP and Akali workers was seen.

Repolling for two booths of Samana and one booth of Patran in Patiala district was held on 16 February 2021.

Repolling for two booths of Mohali is ordered by Punjab Election Commission on 17 February 2021 on the day of results and subsequently, the result for Mohali Municipal Corporation was postponed to 18 February 2021.

Voter statistics

Voter turnout

Schedule 

The election schedule was announced by the Election Commission of Punjab on 16 January 2021.

Party wise candidates

List of participating municipal corporations/councils

Municipal corporations  
Punjab has 13 municipal corporations, and eight went to the polls on 14 February 2021. In contrast, Ludhiana, Jalandhar, Patiala and Amritsar polled in 2018, and polling for Phagwara was suspended due to voter list formation.

List of municipal councils 
The municipal councils list is as follows:

Party wise results

Municipal corporations results

Municipal corporation detailed results

Municipal councils results

District wise municipal councils/nagar panchayat results

Results by municipality

Bypolls

Aftermath 

Indian National Congress won eight out of eight municipal corporations of its own, and nine out of ten independents joined the Indian National Congress in Moga Municipal Corporation.

In municipal councils and nagar panchayats of 109, INC won 78 of its own and 20 with the support of independents, having 98 out of 109. Akali dal won five, and CPI won Joga Council in Mansa. Still, five councils are not clear, and independents have the majority in those five.

See also
 2023 Punjab, India local elections
 2021 Barnala district municipal elections
 2017 Punjab Legislative Assembly election
 2019 Indian general election in Punjab
 2022 Punjab Legislative Assembly election
 2021 elections in India

References

2021 elections in India
Local elections in Punjab, India